Nasirabad (also Romanized as Naşīrābād; also known as Nāşerābād and Nāşrābād) is a village in Deh Chal Rural District, in the Central District of Khondab County, Markazi Province, Iran. At the 2006 census, its population was 428, in 84 families.

References 

Populated places in Khondab County